Doris Achelwilm (born 30 November 1976) is a German journalist and politician of Die Linke party.

Biography 
She was born in Thuine, Lower Saxony. 

She was a member of the German parliament. She was elected at the 2017 federal election and represented the German state of Bremen as a member of The Left Party. She served as part of the Committee on Cultural and Media Affairs in the German parliament. She lost her seat at the 2021 federal election.

References 

1976 births
Living people
People from Emsland
Members of the Bundestag for Bremen
Members of the Bundestag 2017–2021
Female members of the Bundestag
Members of the Bundestag for The Left
21st-century German women politicians